The 1997–98 Biathlon World Cup was a multi-race tournament over a season of biathlon, organised by the International Biathlon Union. The season started on 6 December 1997 in Lillehammer, Norway, and ended on 15 March 1998 in Hochfilzen, Austria. It was the 21st season of the Biathlon World Cup.

Calendar
Below is the IBU World Cup calendar for the 1997–98 season.

World Cup Podium

Men

Women

Men's team

Women's team

Standings: Men

Overall 

Final standings after 18 races.

Individual 

Final standings after 5 races.

Sprint 

Final standings after 10 races.

Pursuit 

Final standings after 3 races.

Relay 

Final standings after 5 races.

Nation 

Final standings after 20 races.

Standings: Women

Overall 

Final standings after 18 races.

Individual 

Final standings after 5 races.

Sprint 

Final standings after 10 races.

Pursuit 

Final standings after 3 races.

Relay 

Final standings after 5 races.

Nation 

Final standings after 20 races.

Medal table

Achievements
Victory in this World Cup (all-time number of victories in parentheses)

Men
 , 4 (10) first places
 , 2 (6) first places
 , 2 (6) first places
 , 2 (2) first places
 , 1 (9) first place
 , 1 (3) first place
 , 1 (3) first place
 , 1 (2) first place
 , 1 (1) first place
 , 1 (1) first place
 , 1 (1) first place
 , 1 (1) first place

Women
 , 6 (12) first places
 , 3 (14) first places
 , 3 (4) first places
 , 1 (6) first place
 , 1 (4) first place
 , 1 (3) first place
 , 1 (2) first place
 , 1 (1) first place
 , 1 (1) first place

Retirements
Following notable biathletes retired after the 1997–98 season:

References

External links

IBU official site

Biathlon World Cup
1997 in biathlon
1998 in biathlon